The 1998 FIBA Africa Basketball Club Championship (16th edition), is an international basketball tournament  held in Fes, Morocco from December 4 to 6, 1998. The tournament was contested by 4 clubs in a round robin system.
 
The tournament was won by MAS Fez from Morocco, with Gezira SC from Egypt, as the defending champion.

Participating teams

Squads

Schedule
Times given below are in UTC.

Day 1

Day 2

Day 3

Final standings

All Tournament Team

See also 
 1999 FIBA Africa Championship

References

External links 
 
 

1998 FIBA Africa Basketball Club Championship
1998 FIBA Africa Basketball Club Championship
1998 FIBA Africa Basketball Club Championship
International basketball competitions hosted by Morocco